Cory Ohnesorge (born May 22, 1984) is a former American football punter.

High school career
Ohnesorge prepped at El Camino High School in Oceanside, California.

College career
Ohnesorge played college football at Occidental College and was a two-time D3football.com All-American selection.  During the 2005 season, Cory led all collegiate punters in average punt distance.  After graduation, Ohnesorge trained at Occidental while coaching football at his alma mater, El Camino High School.  He attended the Ray Pelfrey Professional Kicking Camp in Reno, Nevada in March 2007.

Professional career
Ohnesorge was an offseason signing of the New York Giants and attended the team's rookie minicamp. He was cut on September 1, 2007.

References

External links
New York Giants Bio
Just Sports Stats

1984 births
Living people
American football punters
Sportspeople from Oceanside, California
New York Giants players
Omaha Nighthawks players
Players of American football from California
Occidental Tigers football players